José Diogo Bessa Rocha Ferreira (born 16 January 1999) is a Portuguese professional footballer  as a left back.

Club career
He made his LigaPro debut for FC Porto B on 19 April 2019 in a game against Sporting Covilhã.

On 31 August 2021, he joined Spanish fourth-tier club La Nucía.

References

External links

1999 births
People from Valongo
Living people
Portuguese footballers
Portugal youth international footballers
Association football defenders
FC Porto B players
CF La Nucía players
Liga Portugal 2 players
Portuguese expatriate footballers
Expatriate footballers in Spain
Portuguese expatriate sportspeople in Spain
Sportspeople from Porto District